The 2022 Brabantse Pijl was the 62nd edition of the Brabantse Pijl cycle race and was held on 13 April 2022. The race covered , starting in Leuven and finishing in Overijse. Magnus Sheffield of  took the win with a 3.5km solo. As one of the 3 Ineos Grenadiers team riders in it, he attacked from a leading group of 7 and managed to hold them off to the line to take his second career victory.

Teams 
Thirteen of the eighteen UCI WorldTeams and eight UCI ProTeams made up the twenty-one teams that participated in the race. And  and  only started with 5.

UCI WorldTeams

 
  
  
  
  
  
  
  
 
 
  
  
  

UCI ProTeams

Result

References

2022
Brabantse Pijl
Brabantse Pijl
Brabantse Pijl
Brabantse Pijl